Input/output operations per second (IOPS, pronounced eye-ops) is an input/output performance measurement used to characterize computer storage devices like hard disk drives (HDD), solid state drives (SSD), and storage area networks (SAN). Like benchmarks, IOPS numbers published by storage device manufacturers do not directly relate to real-world application performance.

Background
To meaningfully describe the performance characteristics of any storage device, it is necessary to specify a minimum of three metrics simultaneously: IOPS, response time, and (application) workload.  Absent simultaneous specifications of response-time and workload, IOPS are essentially meaningless.  In isolation, IOPS can be considered analogous to "revolutions per minute" of an automobile engine i.e. an engine capable of spinning at 10,000 RPMs with its transmission in neutral does not convey anything of value, however an engine capable of developing specified torque and horsepower at a given number of RPMs fully describes the capabilities of the engine.

The specific number of IOPS possible in any system configuration will vary greatly, depending upon the variables the tester enters into the program, including the balance of read and write operations, the mix of sequential and random access patterns, the number of worker threads and queue depth, as well as the data block sizes. There are other factors which can also affect the IOPS results including the system setup, storage drivers, OS background operations etc. Also, when testing SSDs in particular, there are preconditioning considerations that must be taken into account.

Performance characteristics
The most common performance characteristics measured are sequential and random operations. Sequential operations access locations on the storage device in a contiguous manner and are generally associated with large data transfer sizes, e.g. ≥ 128 kB. Random operations access locations on the storage device in a non-contiguous manner and are generally associated with small data transfer sizes, e.g. 4kB.

The most common performance characteristics are as follows:

For HDDs and similar electromechanical storage devices, the random IOPS numbers are primarily dependent upon the storage device's random seek time, whereas, for SSDs and similar solid state storage devices, the random IOPS numbers are primarily dependent upon the storage device's internal controller and memory interface speeds. On both types of storage devices, the sequential IOPS numbers (especially when using a large block size) typically indicate the maximum sustained bandwidth that the storage device can handle. Often sequential IOPS are reported as a simple Megabytes per second number as follows:

    (then converted to MB/s)

Some HDDs will improve in performance as the number of outstanding IOs (i.e. queue depth) increases. This is usually the result of more advanced controller logic on the drive performing command queuing and reordering commonly called either Tagged Command Queuing (TCQ) or Native Command Queuing (NCQ). Most commodity SATA drives either cannot do this, or their implementation is so poor that no performance benefit can be seen. Enterprise class SATA drives, such as the Western Digital Raptor and Seagate Barracuda NL will improve by nearly 100% with deep queues. High-end SCSI drives more commonly found in servers, generally show much greater improvement, with the Seagate Savvio exceeding 400 IOPS—more than doubling its performance.

While traditional HDDs have about the same IOPS for read and write operations, many NAND flash-based SSDs and USB sticks are much slower writing than reading due to the inability to rewrite directly into a previously written location forcing a procedure called garbage collection. This has caused hardware test sites to start to provide independently measured results when testing IOPS performance.

Flash SSDs, such as the Intel X25-E (released 2010), have much higher IOPS than traditional HDD. In a test done by Xssist, using Iometer, 4 KB random transfers, 70/30 read/write ratio, queue depth 4, the IOPS delivered by the Intel X25-E 64GB G1 started around 10000 IOPs, and dropped sharply after 8 minutes to 4000 IOPS, and continued to decrease gradually for the next 42 minutes. IOPS vary between 3000 and 4000 from approximately 50 minutes and onwards, for the rest of the 8+ hours the test ran. Even with the drop in random IOPS after the 50th minute, the X25-E still has much higher IOPS compared to traditional hard disk drives. Some SSDs, including the OCZ RevoDrive 3 x2 PCIe using the SandForce controller, have shown much higher sustained write performance that more closely matches the read speed.

Examples

Mechanical hard drives 
Block size used when testing significantly affects the number of IOPS performed by a given drive. See below for some typical performance figures:

Solid-state devices

See also
 Instructions per second
 Performance per watt

References

Computer performance
Data transmission
Units of frequency